The Volkswagen Golf (Mk7) is a small family car (C-segment) produced by German automobile manufacturer Volkswagen as the seventh generation of the Golf and the successor to the Golf Mk6. It was introduced in Berlin on 4 September 2012, before a public launch at the 2012 Paris Motor Show. Sales in Europe began with the model year of 2013, at the end of 2012.

Marketed in three-door and five-door hatchback, van, and estate forms, the Golf Mk7 shares the MQB platform with the third-generation Audi A3, SEAT León and Škoda Octavia.

In November 2016, Volkswagen presented a facelift of the Golf Mk7. It was replaced in December 2019 by the Golf Mk8, which is built on the MQB Evo platform. However, production of e-Golf and Golf Variant ended in the following year, precisely in mid-2020 for Golf Variant.

Overview

Compared with the previous generation, the Golf Mk7 has a roomier cabin with greater shoulder room for the front and rear passengers, more rear legroom, and more boot space. It is  wider than the Mk6, with a  longer wheelbase.

Available body styles are three and five-door hatchbacks (including high-performance Golf GTI and Golf R models), and a five-door estate (known as the SportWagen in the United States, first advertised in May 2015). Sales of the three-door hatchback were not as strong as previous generations, and it was dropped with the launch of the eighth generation model in late 2019.

A van version based on the three-door Golf was sold only in Ireland to commercial customers and was cancelled as corporations opted for the bigger Volkswagen Caddy.

At launch in the US market, Volkswagen also offered the Golf Sport model. About 650 of these SE four-door models were built, equipped with the six-speed automatic transmission. Offered in either Pure White or Platinum Gray, the Sport model is visually enhanced with a body kit that includes a front lip spoiler, side skirts, a rear valence, a larger rear spoiler, and chrome exhaust tips.

The Golf went on sale in the UK in early January and was released in Australia in April 2013.

In Brazil, the Golf Mk7 went on sale in September 2013, only in the High-line and GTI trims, along with the Comfortline trim, which was made available from March 2014. All models were imported from Germany until 2015, when local assembly commenced.

At its introduction in 2013, it won the Car of the Year Japan Award, the first time it was awarded to a European product.

New safety systems 

 First series production Volkswagen with Proactive Occupant Protection, which will close the windows and retract the safety belts to remove excess slack if the potential for a forward crash is detected. Seat belt retraction in a crash situation was also a feature on the Mk6 for the front two seat belts. The front two belts retract if it was buckled in, however if the occupant is relatively light, the seat belt gradually extends in a forward crash situation.
 First series production Volkswagen with multi-collision brake system to automatically brake the car after an accident in order to avoid a second collision.
 adaptive cruise control (optional)
 collision avoidance system (Front Assist) with City Emergency Braking (optional)
 lane-keeping assistant (optional)
 driver fatigue detection (optional)
 traffic sign recognition (optional)
 automatic parking system (optional)
 rear assist camera (optional)

Safety

Euro NCAP
The Golf in its standard European configuration received 5 stars from Euro NCAP in 2012.

Latin NCAP
The Golf in its most basic Latin American configuration with 7 airbags received 5 stars for adult occupants and 5 stars for toddlers from Latin NCAP in 2014, and once again 5 stars for adult occupants and 5 stars for toddlers as well as the Advanced Award in 2017.

IIHS
The 2021 Golf was tested by the IIHS:

Estate 

The estate/station wagon of the Golf was revealed at Geneva Motor Show in March 2013. It was marketed as the Golf Variant in Germany and Golf SportWagen in the United States and Canada, replacing the Jetta SportWagen nameplate previously used in the US.

The Golf Estate's loadspace volume was expanded from the 505 litres of its predecessor to 605 litres (loaded up to the back seat backrest), versus the 380 litres of the Golf hatchback. Loaded up to the front seat backrests and under the roof, the Golf Estate offered a cargo volume of 1,620 litres (versus the 1,495 litres of the Golf Estate Mk6). The rear seat backrests can be folded remotely via a release in the boot. For the first time, the Golf Estate was also available as a "full" BlueMotion model, including revised aerodynamics. This model uses a 1.6-litre diesel engine producing 110 PS and a six-speed manual gearbox, and was expected to achieve a combined fuel consumption of 85.6 mpg (equivalent to 87 g/km of ).

The Golf R Estate used the same EA888 2.0L engine and all-wheel drive system found in the Golf R hatchback, along with the other features unique to the R.

The Golf Alltrack was introduced as a ruggedized version of the Golf Estate with slightly-raised suspension, body cladding, a front skidplate, and all-wheel drive, among other minor mechanical changes.

The Golf SportWagen was available in S, SE, and GT/SEL (Trendline, Comfortline, and Highline in Canada) trim levels and used the same drivetrains as the standard Golf. The Golf Sportwagen was also available with all-wheel drive in the USA and Canada beginning with the 2017 model year, using the 1.8L engine with either a 6-speed manual or 6-speed DSG transmission until its discontinuation in 2020. The AWD Sportwagen shared its drivetrain with the Alltrack, though it did not incorporate the other changes made for that submodel.

e-Golf

The production version of the 2014 Volkswagen e-Golf was unveiled at the 2013 Frankfurt Motor Show. On 14 February 2014, Volkswagen launched sales of the e-Golf in Germany. In Norway, the e-Golf became available for pre-order on 25 February 2014 for delivery in June 2014. On 11 March 2014, Volkswagen opened ordering for the e-Golf in the UK with deliveries began at the end of June. Production of vehicles destined for retail customers began in March 2014. U.S sales started in selected states in November 2014 with a single SEL Premium model for the 2015 model year.

Drivetrain and specifications

A heat pump was available as an option to reduce the power consumed by the heater in cold weather.

The high-voltage traction battery has a storage capacity of 24.2 kWh, composed of 264 individual cells arranged in 27 modules of 6 or 12 cells each. Initially, the e-Golf was announced with a liquid-cooled battery in November 2013. However, the "liquid-cooled" description was removed from subsequent press releases in early 2014. Active thermal management for the battery pack was dropped because internal testing using Mk6 e-Golf prototypes showed high ambient temperatures did not affect battery performance. The smaller battery in the hybrid gasoline-electric GTE does use active thermal management, but that model is positioned as a hybrid version of the sporty GTI, rather than the e-Golf's equivalence as an electric version of the regular Golf Mk7.

The 2014–2016 model year e-Golf has a traction motor (designed EEM 85) and single-speed gearbox (EQ 270) with an output of  /  in "Normal" mode; using "Eco" and "Eco+" mode reduces power / torque output to  /  and  / , respectively; both Eco and Eco+ disable the air conditioning system. In addition, four different levels of regenerative braking can be selected. The standard on-board AC charger has a maximum input power rating of 3.6 kW; as an option, DC fast charging using a Combined Charging System (CCS) connector is available, accepting DC power at a maximum rate of 40 kW. The DC fast charging option also upgrades the on-board AC charger to 7.2 kW.

Externally, the e-Golf can be distinguished from its fossil fueled Mk7 counterparts with full LED headlamps and deletion of the exhaust outlet.

Upgrades in 2017

In addition, the onboard charger was upgraded and accepts AC power at up to 7.2 kW as standard; DC fast charging (with CCS connector) was optional on the SE trim, and made standard for the SEL Premium and Limited Edition trims.

The e-Golf was the last hatchback version of the Golf Mk7 produced in Europe, with production continuing until late December 2020 due to high demand, well after other powertrain variants which were discontinued in 2019. The successor ID.3 had been launched in 2019 and took over the e-Golf's Transparent Factory production line in Dresden, starting at the end of January 2021. In the United States, the production allotment of 2020 model year e-Golfs was diverted to Canada.

In China, domestic e-Golf production by the FAW-Volkswagen joint venture supplanted vehicles imported from Wolfsburg, starting in 2019. This helped VW meet the electric vehicle quota imposed by China: starting in 2019, manufacturers that sell more than 30,000 vehicles per year must ensure that ten percent of those are electric. Chinese production of the e-Golf by FAW-VW at the Foshan plant continued into 2021 with two models, the Golf·Pure Electric Motor and Golf·Pure Electric Motor Pro; the Foshan plant, which produced MQB platform vehicles from its opening in 2014, was retooled to add a MEB vehicle production line and the first ID.4 CROZZ vehicles began production at Foshan in late November 2020.

Spektrum Program 

From the 2017 to 2020 model years, Canadian-market e-Golfs could be optioned with one of 40 custom-order paint colors offered as part of Volkswagen's Spektrum program at a cost of roughly $3,000 CAD. A total of 104 e-Golfs were ordered with a Spektrum-program color.

Golf GTE

The Golf GTE plug-in hybrid is driven by two power sources: a 1.4-litre  TSI direct-injection petrol engine and a 75 kW (102 hp) electric motor. The Golf GTE shares the basic powertrain hardware with the Audi A3 Sportback e-tron but the software controls are different. The Golf GTE also shares the same plug-in hybrid powertrain with the Volkswagen Passat GTE, but the Passat has a larger 9.9 kWh Li-ion battery pack.

Under the New European Driving Cycle, combined fuel economy is  equivalent. The electric power can also be saved—for example when driving to a zero-emissions zone. The 8.8 kWh lithium-ion battery can be charged in around three and a half hours from a domestic mains outlet, or two and a half hours from a domestic wallbox.

The car has 4 (or on some older models 5) driving modes. The car will always starts in all-electric mode (unless the battery has very low charge), a button beside the gear stick allows the driver to select between: Hybrid drive, Which allows the car to switch between electric drive and the petrol motor when driving. Charge Mode; which uses energy from the petrol engine to recharge the car's battery. Battery Hold Mode, this solely uses the petrol engine to save battery power (only available on older models) and back to Electric mode. The final option called 'GTE Mode' has a separate button beside the gear stick which allows the car to use both the petrol engine and the electric motor for a punchy performance.

The Golf GTE uses a six-speed DSG gearbox with a triple-clutch system specially developed for hybrid vehicles. The electric motor is integrated into the gearbox housing, while further hybrid components include power electronics and a charger. An electro-mechanical brake servo and an electric air conditioning compressor make for energy-efficient braking and air conditioning.

Inside as on the outside, the Golf GTE features blue highlights where the GTI has red. This includes stitching on the steering wheel, gear lever gaiter and seats, and a blue stripe in the tartan pattern on the sports seats. It includes bespoke functions for electric vehicles, including the ability to identify potential destinations on electric range, and electric charging points. The GTE will also feature an e-manager which allows the driver to preset vehicle charging, as well as interior cooling or heating. These functions can also be operated remotely using the Volkswagen Car-Net app on a smartphone: a three-year subscription will be included in the UK.

The first GTE units were registered in Germany in August 2014, and it was the second-best selling plug-in hybrid in Europe in 2015 with 17,282 sales.

Golf GTD

The Golf R, in comparison, has  from 1,800 rpm. For comparison, when the first generation Golf BlueMotion went on sale at the end of 2007, it had the same fuel economy and  emissions.

Golf GTI

Both GTI models develop  of torque. The standard GTI accelerates from 0 to 100 km/h in 6.5 seconds and can reach a top speed of 250 km/h. The GTI Performance has a top speed of 250 km/h and accelerates from 0 to 100 km/h in 6.4 seconds. 

Both versions of the GTI are equipped with a start-stop system and fulfil 2014 Euro 6 emissions standards. This means that the latest Golf GTI offers an 18 per cent improvement in fuel economy compared to the previous model.

Buyers who purchase the £980 Performance pack not only gain 7 kW, but also gain upgraded brakes and a limited-slip differential. The front differential is a new development, dubbed VAQ. This provides more neutral and agile driving behaviour and allows higher speeds to be carried through curves. The system consists of a multi-plate coupler between the differential cage and right driveshaft, which controls locking torque electro-hydraulically. Visually, vehicles with the Performance Pack are distinguished by 'GTI' lettering on the front brake caliper, larger vented brake discs front and rear (the same as fitted to the 'R' version), and red GTI badges on the front and rear although some cars still retained their silver badging despite being fitted with the Performance Pack.

As well as high performance, a high level of safety equipment comes as standard in the Golf GTI. On top of high passive safety levels—thanks in part to a passenger cell made from high- and ultra-high strength steels—active safety features include the Automatic Post-Collision Braking system, which automatically applies the vehicle brakes after an accident to reduce the chances of a second impact; the pre-crash system, which tensions seatbelts and closes windows and the sunroof if an accident is likely to improve the effectiveness of the airbags; and seven airbags as standard, including one for the driver's knees.

In many markets including Mexico and South Africa, the GTI version is only available with the five-door body style, with no plans to introduce the three-door body.

Volkswagen introduced a "Rabbit Edition" GTI for the 2019 model year. The Rabbit Edition featured a LED lighting package, "Vmax" spoiler, 18-inch "Pretoria" alloy wheels painted in gloss black, and red tags embroidered with the VW Rabbit logo on the seat.

Volkswagen's Mexican division introduced an "Oettinger" version for the GTI for the 2021 model year. The Oettinger version features an aerodynamic kit for the front fascia with lip and splitters, side skirts, a new rear bumper with integrated diffuser and a new spoiler with flaps, which stand out next to the version-specific 18-inch wheel set and black side mirrors. It is available in three colour options; Pure White, Tornado Red and Cornflower Blue. It will go on sale on 7 December 2020 and 700 units will only be built.

GTI Clubsport (2016) 

Volkswagen introduced the special-edition GTI Clubsport for 2016, coinciding with the GTI's 40th anniversary. The Clubsport was not available in the United States. On the exterior, the Clubsport features a revised front fascia, more aggressive rear hatch spoiler, new rear diffuser with larger exhaust tips, and a black stripe along the lower sides of the body. Inside the car, the Clubsport is equipped with bucket seats and an Alcantara steering wheel and shift lever.

The Clubsport uses the same 2.0-litre EA888 turbocharged inline-4 as the standard GTI which has been revised to produce 261 horsepower, with up to 286 horsepower for 10 seconds at a time via an included overboost feature which raises the engine's boost pressure by 0.2 bar, up to 2.1 bar. Transmission choices remain the same as the standard GTI, with both the 6-speed manual and 6-speed DSG available, both equipped with the standard GTI's optional limited-slip differential. Weight is listed as 1,375 kg. The Clubsport was available from the factory with optional Michelin Pilot Sport Cup 2 tires. The official 0-to-60 time is quoted as 5.9 seconds, 0.6 seconds quicker than the standard GTI with Performance Package.

GTI Clubsport S 
The 3-door GTI Clubsport S was a limited-edition version of the GTI Clubsport sold as a higher-strung version optimized for faster track times. Only 400 were produced for the 2016 model year.

The result of these modifications is a lap time of 7 minutes 49.21 seconds around the Nürburgring Nordschleife track, 1.4 seconds faster than the Honda Civic Type R which held the previous record for a front wheel drive production car. The Clubsport S was released with an estimated base price of £35,000.

GTI TCR (2019) 

In January 2019 Volkswagen introduced new high-performance variation Golf GTI TCR with 290 PS 2-litre engine and special trim.

Golf R

Like the GTI, the Golf R is also built as a three- or five-door hatchback. Compared to the GTI's powerplant, the Golf R's engine has a modified cylinder head, exhaust valves, valve seats and springs, pistons, injection valves and larger intercooler and turbocharger. DSG equipped models also come with an auxiliary oil cooler on the passenger side on right hand drive models.

0-62 mph (100 km/h) takes 5.1 seconds (versus 5.7 seconds for previous Golf R), or 4.9 seconds with optional DSG gearbox.

The R uses an updated, fifth-generation Haldex 4MOTION four-wheel drive system. Under low loads or when coasting, the rear axle is decoupled, helping to reduce fuel consumption. Drive to the rear axle can be engaged in fractions of a second via the Haldex coupling, which is actuated by an electro-hydraulic pump. Up to 50 percent of power can be transferred to the rear axle. A brake actuated, XDS+ system mimics a limited-slip differential by applying the brakes to the wheel with the least traction, this is on both the front and rear axles.

The ride height is 20 mm lower than the standard Golf. Golf R models equipped with the optional 'DCC' (Dynamic Chassis Control), offer three suspension modes: 'Comfort', 'Normal', and 'Race'. Each mode adjusts the stiffness of the suspension damping, thereby offering drivers a way to change the way the vehicle responds by the push of a button. Comfort mode places the dampers in the softest setting, increasing the absorption of road imperfections allowing for a smoother and more comfortable ride. Race mode stiffens the dampers to their most aggressive setting, reducing body movements and increasing adhesion to the road for more precise high speed driving. Race mode also increases throttle response, firms up the steering for a heftier feel, and alters the shift pattern of the DSG gearbox (where fitted) as well as increases the speed of the Adaptive headlamps (AFS) response time.

On top of ESC Sport mode, as found on the GTI and GTD, which delays intervention of the electronic stability control system, the R offers the option fully to disengage the ESC, for track driving.

For the Canadian market, the optional Discover Pro 8" infotainment system is available as part of the single option "Technology Package", while only the 6.5" Discover is available to US consumers. In North America The Golf R comes standard with halogen tail lights and HID Bi-Xenon Headlight with LED front and side view mirror turn signals, while ROW markets received the options for a sunroof, a three-door version, and LED tail lights. All these features are not available to the North American version. The Golf R and e-Golf are the only Golf models available in North America that was produced in Germany. Other Golf models for the North American market are produced by Volkswagen de México in Puebla, Mexico.

A limited edition Golf R400 was rumored in August 2015 by Heinz-Jakob Neusser, then-head of brand development, but in the wake of the Volkswagen emissions scandal (and Neusser's suspension) it was cancelled in favor of focusing on the Golf R.

For the South African market, the Golf R received another upgrade in power in March 2019. Additionally, the Golf R was also optionally available with an Akrapovič performance exhaust from the factory.

The Mk7 Golf R was discontinued in the United States in August 2019.

Spektrum Program 

For the 2018 model year in Canada and 2019 model year in both Canada and the United States, Volkswagen offered 40 custom-order paint colors for the Golf R as part of their Spektrum Program. The program was initially introduced only for Canadian-market e-Golfs. Many of the colors offered were previously available on past Volkswagen Group models. The option carried a lead time of two to four months, as each car ordered as part of the Spektrum program was hand-painted in a separate facility from the main production line. Each custom-order color carried an MSRP in the United States of $2,500.

A total of 473 Spektrum Golf Rs were produced, with 199 going to the United States, before the Mk7 Golf R's discontinuation in North America.

Facelift
In November 2016, Volkswagen revealed a facelifted version of the Golf Mk7. This model is referred to as the "New Golf" by Volkswagen while it is often informally referred to as the Golf 7.5. Initially, the existing 1.4-litre TSI was available alongside the new 1.5-litre engine. In addition, the facelift increased infotainment screen size across the range as well as adding the option for a fully digital dashboard. The rear lights now utilise LED technology as standard (including a "sweeping" indicator effect on performance models) while this technology is optional on most models for the headlights.

The facelifted Golf Mk7 was released in North America for the 2018 model year. The previous 1.8L EA888 engine was replaced by the 147hp 1.4L EA211 engine as the only available powerplant, while the 5-speed manual and 6-speed automatic transmissions were replaced by 6- and 8-speed units, respectively. The all-wheel drive Golf Sportwagen and Golf Alltrack models retained the 1.8L EA888 engine along with the 6-speed manual or 6-speed DSG transmissions.

Powertrain

The Golf line is available in all the relevant drive systems: the Golf TSI, including GTI, is petrol-powered; Golf TDI, including GTD, is diesel-powered; the Golf TGI is powered by compressed natural gas (CNG); the e-Golf is powered by electricity; and Golf GTE is a plug-in hybrid. The use of a modular transverse matrix assembly kit enables the manufacturing of Golf models with gasoline, diesel, natural gas, electric and hybrid drives from bumper to bumper at Volkswagen factories. Retail deliveries of the e-Golf in Germany began in the second quarter of 2014. U.S. sales started in selected markets during the fourth quarter of 2014. The Golf GTE was launched also in the fourth quarter of 2014.

All internal combustion engines are three- or four-cylinder units:

Awards
 Car and Drivers 10Best list in 2019
 2015 North American Car of the Year
 2015 Motor Trend Car of the Year
 2013 European Car of the Year
 2013 World Car of the Year
 2013 Car of the Year Japan
 2013–14 Japan's Import Car of the Year
 2014 What Car?—Best Estate Car (Great Britain)
 2013 Wheels Car of the Year (Australia)
 2013 Cars Guide Car of the Year (Australia)

Golf Sportsvan/SV 

The Golf Sportsvan or Golf SV is a five-door compact MPV which was designed and produced by the German automaker Volkswagen between 2014 and 2020. Previewed as the Volkswagen Sportsvan concept at the 2013 Frankfurt Motor Show and positioned below the three-row Touran, it is derived from the Golf Mk7 and based on the MQB platform, and was also assembled at the Wolfsburg plant alongside the standard Golf hatchback. At 4,338 mm long, the new SV is 134 mm longer than the Golf Plus that it replaces, 83 mm longer than the Golf hatchback, and 224 mm shorter than the Golf Estate.

Compared with the boot of its predecessor, the capacity is increased by 76 litres to 500 litres with the back seats at their rear-most position (versus the Golf's 380 litres and the Estate's 605 litres). Moving the rear seats forwards increases the luggage capacity to 590 litres, while folding the rear seats liberates up to 1,520 litres of room. The front passenger seat can also optionally fold fully forward, creating a load space which is up to 2,484 mm long.

Like the Golf, the Golf SV comes with many standard and optional safety systems. These include a standard automatic post-collision braking system, which automatically brakes the vehicle after a collision to reduce kinetic energy significantly and thus minimise the chance of a second impact, and a PreCrash system (Proactive Occupant Protection) which, on detecting the possibility of an accident, pre-tensions seatbelts and closes the windows and sunroof, leaving just a small gap, to ensure the best possible protection from the airbags.

A first for the Golf SV is a blind spot monitor, dubbed Side Scan, with an assistant for exiting parking spaces. This monitors the area behind and to the sides of the vehicle, ensuring easier and safer egress when reversing from a parking bay. It will be packaged as an option together with Lane Assist.

Powertrain 
Powering the SV is a range of petrol and diesel engines, all of which incorporate Stop/Start and battery regeneration systems. There are two turbocharged 1.2-litre petrol engines with 85 and 105 PS; two 1.4-litre turbocharged petrol engines with 125 and 150 PS; and three turbodiesels: a 2.0-litre 150 PS, a 1.6-litre 90 PS and a 1.6-litre 110 PS. All engines apart from the 1.2-litre TSI 85 PS can be ordered with a DSG gearbox.

References

External links

All-wheel-drive vehicles
Compact cars
Front-wheel-drive vehicles
Hot hatches
Euro NCAP small family cars
Latin NCAP small family cars
Cars introduced in 2012
Golf 7
Hybrid electric cars
Plug-in hybrid vehicles
Station wagons